is a train station on the Kyoto Municipal Subway Karasuma Line in Sakyō-ku, Kyoto, Japan. It is the beginning of the line, and was opened on 3 June 1997.

Lines

 (Station Number: K01)

Layout
The station has an island platform serving two tracks.

Around the station
The center can be accessed by short walk from the station.

Kyoto International Conference Center
Grand Prince Hotel Kyoto
Iwakura Station (Eizan Railway Kurama Line)
Entsu-ji
Takaragaike-dori
Doshisha Elementary School, Doshisha Junior and Senior High School

Bus stops
Kokusaikaikan-ekimae
Kyoto City Bus: Bus stop A
Route 5 for Shijo Kawaramachi and Kyōto Station
Route 31 for Gion and  
Route 65 for Karasuma Marutamachi and Shijo Karasuma
Kyoto City Bus: Bus stop B
Route 5, 31, 65 for Iwakura Depot
Kyoto Bus Co., Ltd.: Bus stop 1
Route 24 for Iwakura Jisso-in
Route 26 for Iwakura Muramatsu (part of buses run via Iwakura Shimozaichicho)
Route 29 for Iwakura Muramatsu via Iwakura Shinozaichicho and Nagatani Hachimangu
Route 45, 46 for Iwakura Muramatsu
Kyoto Bus Co., Ltd.: Bus stop 2
Route 40 for Kyoto Sangyo Daigaku-mae and  via Hokuryo Koko-mae, Kyoto Seika Daigaku-mae and Chikyuken-mae
Route 45 for Kyoto Station, Entsujimichi and Hakuaikai Byoin-mae
Route 46 for Kitaoji Station, Entsujimichi and Hakuaikai Byoin-mae
Route 50 for Ichihara via Hokuryo Koko-mae, Kyoto Seika Daigaku-mae and Chikyuken-mae
for  via Hanazonobashi and Kawabata-dori (running only on weekdays)
for Takano Depot via Takaragaike Kyugijo-mae (running except weekdays)
Kyoto Bus Co., Ltd.: Bus stop 3
Route 19 for Ohara and Kodeishi via Hanazonobashi and

References

External links
 Access map from Kokusaikaikan Station to ICC Kyoto  
 Station information by City of Kyoto 

Railway stations in Kyoto Prefecture
Railway stations in Japan opened in 1997